Uroplectes formosus is a species of scorpion in the family Buthidae, and the smallest species in the genus Uroplectes. U. formosus is found on trees, often under bark.

References

Buthidae
Arthropods of Africa